The FIL World Luge Natural Track Championships 2007 took place in Grande Prairie, Alberta, Canada. It was the first time that the championships were held outside Europe.

Men's singles

Women's singles

Men's doubles

Mixed team

Medal table

References
Men's doubles natural track World Champions
Men's singles natural track World Champions
Mixed teams natural track World Champions
Women's singles natural track World Champions

FIL World Luge Natural Track Championships
2007 in luge
Sport in Grande Prairie
2007 in Alberta
2002 in Canadian sports
International luge competitions hosted by Canada